Prime Evil is the sixth studio album by British heavy metal band Venom. It was released in 1989 and is the first in a series of three albums with Atomkraft bassist and vocalist Tony Dolan, replacing Conrad "Cronos" Lant, as a band member and composer.

Track listing

Personnel
Venom
 Demolition Man – bass, vocals
 Mantas – lead guitar 
 Al Barnes – rhythm guitar
 Abaddon – drums

Production
Nick Tauber, Kevin Ridley – producers
Barry Clempson – engineer
Steve Brew – assistant engineer

References

Venom (band) albums
1989 albums
Albums produced by Kevin Ridley